Asia Pacific Airlines is a cargo airline headquartered in Tamuning, Guam, USA. It operates cargo charter services from Guam and Honolulu. Its main base is Guam International Airport. As of February 2023, its operations have been suspended by the U.S. Federal Aviation Administration, over concerns about their pilots' qualifications.

History
The airline was established on June 5, 1998, and started operations with the Boeing 727-200 on June 3, 1999. It was formed as Aero Micronesia, Inc. and is an affiliate company of the Tan Holdings Corporation. The primary aspect of the airline's operation is the shipment of US Mail, and other cargo, throughout Micronesia, as well as the importation of fresh high grade tuna for transshipment to worldwide fish markets.

As of January 2015 the airline has begun the process of bringing the Boeing 757-200 into service as part of fleet modernization and expansion.

In February 2023, the American Federal Aviation Administration suspended the operating authority of the airline, after they "failed to produce records showing that the two individuals who provide proficiency checks for company pilots were properly trained and qualified for the past two years," making any approvals of the airline's pilots invalid. The grounding led to supply chain disruptions across Micronesia, particularly in the Marshall Islands, where the airline was the sole air cargo carrier. Mail disruptions and shortages of medical supplies were reported, leading to state of emergency being declared by President David Kabua.

Destinations
Asia Pacific Airlines flies to the following destinations:

Fleet

Current fleet

The Asia Pacific Airlines fleet consists of the following aircraft (as of December 2021):

Former fleet
The airline previously operated the following aircraft as of August 2016:
2 Boeing 727-200F
1 Boeing 727-200F Super27
1 Boeing 757-200

Accidents and incidents
On February 26, 2016, a Boeing 727-200F (registered N86425) landed in Antonio B. Won Pat International Airport from Guam to Pohnpei without a nose wheel landing gear.

See also
List of airlines of the United States

References

External links

Official website 

Airlines of Guam
Cargo airlines of the United States
Airlines established in 1998